Mirko Castillo (born August 30, 1962 in Lima, Peru) was a Peruvian soccer forward who spent his entire professional career in the United States.  He played two seasons in the American Soccer League, tying Ricardo Alonso as the 1990 league leading scorer.  He then played two seasons in the American Professional Soccer League and over a dozen years playing in five indoor leagues.

Outdoor
Although Castillo began playing soccer in Peru, including time on the Alianza Lima youth teams, he moved to the United States in 1988 to sign with the Fort Lauderdale Strikers of the American Soccer League.  In 1989, he moved to the Miami Sharks where he tied Ricardo Alonso as the league's leading scorer with ten goals.  However, he finished second to Alonso in the points standings.  In 1990, the ASL merged with the Western Soccer League to form the American Professional Soccer League.  That summer, Castillo played for both the Tampa Bay Rowdies and the Washington Diplomats in the APSL.  In the summer of 1991, he returned to the Fort Lauderdale Strikers, but played only two games with the team.

Indoor
Castillo began his indoor soccer career with the Memphis Rogues of the National Professional Soccer League in 1989.  The Rogues traded him to the Chicago Power in mid-December.  He spent two seasons in Chicago before moving to the St. Louis Storm of the Major Indoor Soccer League (MISL) where he had three goals and one assist in six games. After being released by St. Louis he was signed by the San Diego Sockers on December 6, 1991. In 1992, the MISL collapsed and Castillo moved back to the Chicago Power.  Castillo played the 1992–1993 season, but was released by the Power in the summer of 1993 after he engaged in several heated confrontations with head coach Pato Margetic.  On January 8, 1994, the Power shuffled its coaching staff and signed Castillo for the remainder of the season.  That summer, he joined the Houston Hotshots of the Continental Indoor Soccer League, a summer indoor league.  He moved to the Arizona Sandsharks for the 1994 CISL season, scoring 23 goals.  In the fall of 1995, he signed with the Detroit Rockers, playing the 1995–1996 NPSL season.  In 1996, Castillo began the summer indoor season with the Seattle SeaDogs of the CISL, but was waived on July 25, 1996.  In September, he signed with the Indiana Twisters.  He played the rest of the 1996 season in Indiana and the entire 1997 CISL season there.  At the end of the 1997 season, the Twisters and CISL collapsed and in September 1997 the Edmonton Drillers selected Castillo in the supplemental draft.  Castillo did not sign with the Drillers, but moved to the Baltimore Spirit for the 1997–1998 season.  On February 5, 1998 the Spirit waived Castillo.  He then played the 1998–1999 season with the Montreal Impact in the NPSL.  He was back with the Houston Hotshots in the summer of 1999.  This time, the Hotshots were in the World Indoor Soccer League.  That fall, he signed with the St. Louis Ambush of the NPSL, but played only three games.

Coaching
Beginning in 1998, Castillo has held numerous positions as a director of coaching, coach and trainer with several youth soccer clubs in the Houston area.

External links
 Career Overview

References

1962 births
Living people
Footballers from Lima
Peruvian footballers
Peruvian expatriate footballers
American Indoor Soccer Association players
American Professional Soccer League players
American Soccer League (1988–89) players
American soccer coaches
Arizona Sandsharks players
Baltimore Spirit players
Chicago Power players
Continental Indoor Soccer League players
Detroit Rockers players
Fort Lauderdale Strikers (1988–1994) players
Expatriate soccer players in Canada
Expatriate soccer players in the United States
Houston Hotshots players
Indiana Twisters players
Major Indoor Soccer League (1978–1992) players
Memphis Rogues players
Miami Freedom players
Montreal Impact (1992–2011) players
National Professional Soccer League (1984–2001) players
San Diego Sockers (original MISL) players
Seattle SeaDogs players
St. Louis Storm players
Tampa Bay Rowdies (1975–1993) players
Washington Diplomats (1988–1990) players
World Indoor Soccer League players
Association football forwards